Roger & Val Have Just Got In is a British sitcom that stars Dawn French and Alfred Molina playing married couple Roger and Val Stephenson.  The show premiered on BBC Two on 6 August 2010 and six episodes were broadcast for the first series. The show was created by Dawn French, directed by Jamie Rafn, and written by Beth Kilcoyne and Emma Kilcoyne.

Each episode is set in the half-hour after Roger and Val arrive home from work. Episodes play out in real time without a laugh track.

In May 2011 Dawn French was nominated for a BAFTA for her role as Val.

The series was briefly available on the Netflix platform in the UK.

Plot
Dawn French and Alfred Molina star in this comedy series focusing on the everyday, seemingly trivial trials and tribulations faced by a middle-aged married couple. The bittersweet comedy looks at how they get on in the first half an hour after walking through their front door. It is set in the fictional area of 'Southmoor', in the south of Bristol.

Production
Six episodes were produced for the first series by the BBC. The show was created by Dawn French, the director is Jamie Rafn and the writers are Beth Kilcoyne and Emma Kilcoyne. A further six episodes were also produced for the BBC for 2012.

Episode list

Series 1 (2010)

Series 2 (2012)

Home media
The first series of Roger & Val was released on DVD on 13 September 2010. The second series was released on DVD in February 2013.

References

External links

2010s British sitcoms
2010 British television series debuts
2012 British television series endings
BBC high definition shows
BBC television sitcoms
English-language television shows
Television duos
Television series about marriage